The 2013–14 Segunda División season (known as the Liga Adelante for sponsorship reasons) was the 83rd since its establishment. The season started on 17 August 2013 and the league phase of 42 rounds ended on 8 June 2014. The entire season ended on 22 June 2014 with the promotion play-off finals.

Teams

Promotion and relegation (pre-season)
A total of 22 teams contested the league, including 15 sides from the 2012–13 season, four promoted from the 2012–13 Segunda División B and three relegated from the 2012–13 La Liga.

RCD Mallorca, Deportivo de La Coruña and Real Zaragoza were the teams relegated from La Liga the previous season. Mallorca was relegated after sixteen years in La Liga, the longest period in its history and ending their golden era, Zaragoza returned to the Segunda División after a four-year tenure in La Liga, while Deportivo de La Coruña made an immediate return to the Segunda División after being promoted the previous year. All three teams were relegated in the last matchday. Elche CF was promoted the previous season to La Liga after 14 consecutive seasons in the Segunda División. Villarreal made an immediate return to La Liga after a win over Almería in the decisive match of the last matchday where the winner would be directly promoted to La Liga. Almería was promoted on 22 June 2013 as winner of play-off games after two years of absence in La Liga.

The teams which had been relegated from the Segunda División the previous season were Guadalajara, Racing Santander, Huesca and Xerez. Xerez was relegated after twelve years in the division some weeks before the end of season. On 2 June 2013, after the penultimate matchday, Racing, Huesca and Murcia were relegated after Mirandés' win, however on 4 June 2013 LaLiga relegated Guadalajara and the three teams had their last opportunity to stay in Segunda División in the last matchday. Finally, Huesca was relegated after five years in the second level, while Racing de Santander returned to the third level after twenty years and nineteen of them in La Liga. Murcia was the team saved from the relegation after the administrative relegation of Guadalajara.

The four teams relegated were replaced by four Segunda División B teams: Deportivo Alavés (group 2 champions and overall champions) and CD Tenerife (group 1 champions and overall runners-up), both from the champions play-offs and two from the third round play-offs: Eibar and Jaén. Alavés and Tenerife returned to the second level respectively after 4 and 2 years, while Eibar and Jaén returned to the second level respectively after 4 and 11 years.

Guadalajara case
Guadalajara was relegated to Segunda División B administratively after irregularities detected in the capital increase made the previous summer for conversion to a Sociedad Anónima Deportiva. Murcia remained in Segunda after the relegation administratively of Guadalajara, however RFEF didn't recognize the unilateral sanction by LFP and the relegated or saved team was disputed between Guadalajara and Murcia until Spanish sports jurisdictional body, the CEDD (part of CSD), would make a resolution. CEDD ruled refusing the precautionary suspension of Guadalajara relegation, whereby Murcia remained in Segunda.

Stadia and locations

Personnel and sponsorship

Managerial changes

League table

Positions by round
The table lists the positions of teams after completion of each round.

Results
The draw of the matchdays calendar was on 9 July 2013.

Promotion play-offs

This promotion phase (known as Promoción de ascenso) is to determine the third team which will be promoted to 2014–15 La Liga. Teams placed between 3rd and 6th position (excluding reserve teams) take part in the promotion play-offs. Fifth placed faces against the fourth, while the sixth positioned team faces against the third. The first leg of the semi-finals will be played on 11 June, the best positioned team plays at home the second leg on 15 June. The final will also be two-legged, with the first leg on 19 June and the second leg on 22 June, with the best positioned team also playing at home the second leg.

In case of a draw after the overtime in the second leg, there will not be a penalty shoot-out, and the best positioned team in the league table directly passes to the next round.

Play-offs

Semifinals

First leg

Second leg

Final

Season statistics

Top goalscorers

Zamora Trophy

The Zamora Trophy is awarded by newspaper Marca to the goalkeeper with least goals-to-games ratio. Keepers must play at least 28 games of 60 or more minutes to be eligible for the trophy.

In the table, only goalkeepers with at least the 70% of the games played are included.

Attendances

Awards

Monthly awards

Teams by autonomous community

See also
 List of Spanish football transfers summer 2013
 2013–14 La Liga
 2013–14 Segunda División B
 2013–14 Copa del Rey

References 

 
2013-14
2
Spain